Pattharon Ka Saudagar is a Bollywood film. It was released in 1944. It was directed by Shorey Daulatvi for Sohrab Modi's Minerva Movietone banner. The music was composed by Mir Saheb and the film starred Al Nasir, Sheela, Meena Shorey, K. N. Singh, Jilloobai and Sankatha Prasad.

References

External links
 

1944 films
1940s Hindi-language films
Indian black-and-white films